Aprilynne Pike is an internationally best-selling American author best known for her debut novel Wings, which was released in English on May 5, 2009.

Biography
Aprilynne Pike was born in Salt Lake City, Utah, and grew up in Phoenix, Arizona. She enjoyed creative writing even as a young child. She received a scholarship to Lewis-Clark State College in Lewiston, Idaho, and earned her B.A. in creative writing at the age of 20. Aprilynne and her husband, Kenneth, have four children. She currently lives in Arizona. In addition to writing, she has worked as an editor, a waitress, and childbirth educator and doula.

Pike tried to get published for several years without success. Her first book to be published was  Wings (2009) which became a New York Times best-seller. This book became part of a four-book series written by Pike. Wings debuted as a New York Times best-seller and reached the #1 spot on the Children's Best Seller list, making Pike the best-selling non-celebrity children's author to debut in 2009.  Her second novel likewise debuted on the New York Times Best Seller list.  When her debut series reached three books and was moved to the New York Times best-selling Children's Series list, it became a best-selling series. Illusions and Destined also debuted on the USA Today Bestseller list, which combines books across all genres.

Pike cites several authors as influential in her writing, including young adult authors Stephenie Meyer—who promoted Pike's debut via cover blurb—and Lois Lowry.

Publications

Books
Wings Series
 Wings (2009)
 Spells (2010)
 Illusions/Wild (2011)
 Destined (2012)
 Arabesque (2016)

Earthbound Series
 Earthbound (2013) 
 Earthquake (2014)
 Earthrise (2015)

Charlotte Westing Chronicles
 Sleep No More (2014)
 Sleep of Death (2014) 
The Kingdom of Versailles
 Glitter (2016)
 Shatter (2018) 
Standalone works
 Life After Theft (2013)

Short stories
 "Nature" in Defy the Dark (2013) 

Novellas
 One Day More: A Life After Theft Novella (2013)

Essays
 "Now and Then" in Dear Bully: 70 Authors Tell Their Stories, HarperTeen (2011) ISBn 978-0062060976

References

External links
 
 Finding aid to Aprilynne Pike papers, MSS 8125 at L. Tom Perry Special Collections, Brigham Young University

1981 births
Living people
21st-century American novelists
American women novelists
Writers from Salt Lake City
Lewis–Clark State College alumni
21st-century American women writers
Novelists from Utah
Latter Day Saints from Arizona
Latter Day Saints from Utah
American Latter Day Saint writers